William Laurentz (26 Feb 1895 – 7 March 1922) was a French tennis player of the early 20th century whose main achievements were winning the singles title at the World Hard Court Championships and World Covered Court Championships.

Career
Laurentz achieved his breakthrough in April 1911 at age 16 when he defeated the Wimbledon champion Anthony Wilding in the final of the French Covered Court Championships in Paris.

In March 1912 he was playing in the Challenge Round of the Championship of France against Andre Gobert when at 2–4 in the first set a ball that glanced off his racket struck him in the eye. Subsequently, the eye had to be removed.

He notably won the mixed doubles at the French Championships in 1912 and 1913, when the tournament was open only to French residents, and the singles at the International Lawn Tennis Federation's (ILTF) 1920 World Hard Court Championships (WHCC). In the final of the latter, played on clay courts at the Stade Français in Paris, he beat Andre Gobert in four sets. Together with Gobert he additionally won the men's doubles title at the WHCC in 1920 and 1921. In 1921 he won the singles title at the World Covered Court Championships (WCCC), played in Copenhagen on an indoor wood surface, beating Alfred Beamish in the final in straight sets.

Laurentz participated at the Wimbledon Championships for the first time in 1919, losing in straight sets in the first round to Algernon Kingscote. His best Wimbledon result came the following year, 1920, when he reached the third round in which he was defeated by his compatriot Jacques Brugnon in four sets. He was entered for the 1921 Championships but withdrew before his first round match against Andre Gobert.

He was ranked World No. 8 for 1920 by A. Wallis Myers of The Daily Telegraph.

Between 1912 and 1921 he played in five ties for the French Davis Cup team and has a record of three wins and seven defeats.

Laurentz died suddenly in Paris on 7 March 1922 of septicaemia following upon influenza.

Playing style
In his book The Art of Lawn Tennis (1920) Bill Tilden described Laurentz as "another brilliant, erratic and intensely interesting figure that France has given the tennis world..." who played mostly by instinct. Tilden describes Laurentz' service as one of "several varieties, all well played. He uses an American twist as his regular delivery, but varies it with a sharp slice, a reverse twist of great spin, and a fast cannon-ball smash." His volleying was "brilliant...but very erratic" and his overhead smashes were judged likewise. He had great fighting skills and played at his best when behind but was prone to anxiety lapses. Tilden concludes that "Laurentz might beat anyone in the world on his day or lose to the veriest dub when at his worst.".

Titles

Singles titles
World Hard Court Championship (on Clay) 1920

Boulogne 1920

World Covered Court Championship (Indoor) 1921

Singles runners-up
Barcelona 1921 (lost to Manuel Alonso de Areyzaga 6–4, 6–2, 6–2)

Mixed doubles titles

References

External links 
 
 

1895 births
1922 deaths
French Championships (tennis) champions
French male tennis players
Tennis players from Paris